The 1981 British Formula Three Championship (known as the 1981 Marlboro British F3 Championship for sponsorship reasons) was the 31st season of the British Formula Three Championship. The title was won by Jonathan Palmer driving for West Surrey Racing in the Ralt RT3 (Toyota). He finished the season with 126 points and 7 wins ahead of Belgian Thierry Tassin with 91 points (5 wins), and Brazilian Raul Boesel with 80 points (3 wins).

Race calendar and results

Championship Standings

References

British Formula Three Championship seasons
1981 in British motorsport